Geh' mit Gott is a compilation album in German by Swedish singer Agnetha Fältskog, released in 1994 by Royal Records. The album contains Fältskog's German singles recorded for Metronome and CBS between 1968 and 1972. It was quickly deleted and is now a collector's item amongst ABBA fans. Presumably, the original master tapes for the German recordings are lost, as the sound on this CD has been transferred from the original singles. The compilation's first release of the German singles was Agnetha in Germany by Odoriko Music, in 1989.

Recording session
'Robinson Crusoe' & 'Sonny Boy' were recorded during 1968 just after the first album "Agnetha Fältskog", and before the duet with Edman. 'Señor Gonzales' & 'Concerto D'Amore', early 1969, just before "Agnetha Fältskog Vol. 2". 'Mein schönster Tag' & 'Wie der Wind' during the second album. 'Tausend Wunder', 'Komm doch zu mir' & 'Ich denk' an dich' with the album "När en vacker tanke blir en sång" in 1972. 'Geh' mit Gott' is the "Sacco e Vanzetti" film theme (Ennio Morricone) "Here's to You" originally recorded by Joan Baez. ("Agnetha Fältskog De Första Åren" 1967 - 1979 booklet)

Track listing
"Robinson Crusoe" (Giorgio Moroder) – 2:33
"Sonny Boy" (Hans Urlich Weigel) – 2:36
"Señor Gonzales" (Hans Urlich Weigel–Howard Evans–William Jenkins) – 2:28
"Mein schönster Tag" (Georg Buschor) – 2:59
"Concerto d'Amore" (Hans Blum) – 2:23
"Wie der Wind" (Hans Urlich Weigel) – 2:58
"Wer schreibt heut' noch Liebesbriefe" (Reneé Marcard) – 2:26
"Das Fest der Pompadour" (Reneé Marcard) – 2:36
"Fragezeichen mag ich nicht" (Hans Blum–Horst Bredow) – 2:34
"Wie der nächste Autobus" (Fred Jay) – 2:23
"Ein kleiner Mann in einer Flasche" (Billy Meshel–Curt List) – 2:41
"Ich suchte Liebe bei Dir" (Joachim Heider–Joachim Relin) – 2:47
"Geh' mit Gott" (Ennio Morricone–Fred Jay–Joan Baez) – 3:04
"Tausend Wunder" (Agnetha Fältskog–Ben Juris) – 3:22
"Komm' doch zu mir" (Robert Puschmann–Sven Linus) – 3:22
"Ich denk' an Dich" (Agnetha Fältskog–Ben Juris) – 3:00

References

Agnetha Fältskog compilation albums
1994 compilation albums